Alfred Leon Foster (1904-1994) was an American mathematician. He was a professor at the University of California, Berkeley from 1934 until 1971. In 1932 he was an Invited Speaker at the ICM in Zürich.

In 1934 he accepted a regular position at Berkeley. At that time Griffith Evans was Head of the Mathematics Department and was charged by President Sproul with building a first-class mathematics center, which he did. Alfred Foster and Charles Morrey (who became the first department chairman after Evans' retirement) were Evans' first two appointments. Except for subsequent sabbatical leaves, spent most notably in Freiburg and Tübingen, Foster served continuously at Berkeley until his retirement at the then-mandatory age of 67 in 1971.

Foster's Ph.D. dissertation and his first few papers were in the area of mathematical logic. Starting from this point, he soon focused his interest on the related theory of Boolean algebras and Boolean rings, and was thus led from logic to algebra. He extensively studied the role of duality in Boolean theory and subsequently developed a theory of n-ality for certain rings which played for n-valued logics the role of Boolean rings vis-a-vis Boolean algebras. The late Benjamin Bernstein of the Berkeley mathematics faculty was his collaborator in some of this research. This work culminated in his seminal paper “The theory of Boolean-like rings” appearing in 1946.

Foster was married to Else Wagner; their marriage produced four children and eight grandchildren.

Selected publications

References

20th-century American mathematicians
University of California, Berkeley College of Letters and Science faculty
Princeton University alumni
1904 births
1994 deaths
California Institute of Technology alumni